St Luke's Church, Shireoaks is a Grade II listed Church of England parish church in Shireoaks, Nottinghamshire.

History
The church was built in a Decorated style in 1861-63 by T. C. Hine and Robert Evans for the fifth Duke of Newcastle. The Foundation stone was laid on 18 October 1861 (St Luke's day) by the Prince of Wales who was staying at Clumber Park with Henry Pelham-Clinton, 5th Duke of Newcastle.

The church was dedicated on the same day in 1863 by the Bishop of Lincoln, Rt. Revd John Jackson.

Originally the church had a spire but this was removed in 1975.

Organ
The pipe organ dates from 1896 and was built by Forster and Andrews. A specification of the organ can be found on the National Pipe Organ Register.

Bells
The church tower contains a ring of 6 bells dating from 1863/64. They were cast by John Taylor & Co of Loughborough.

References

Church of England church buildings in Nottinghamshire
Scrooby
Thomas Chambers Hine buildings